Doris Abeßer (15 March 1935 – 26 January 2016) was a German actress and radio personality. She was born in Berlin and appeared in television and films from 1952 onwards. She was awarded an Erich Weinert Medal by Free German Youth in 1961. She married Günter Stahnka, a German film director in 1963.

Filmography 
 1956: Zwischenfall in Benderath
 1957: Bärenburger Schnurre
 1959: Eine alte Liebe
 1960: Das Leben beginnt
 1960: Seilergasse 8
 1961: Septemberliebe
 1964: Das Lied vom Trompeter
 1964: Doppelt oder nichts 
 1965: Der Frühling braucht Zeit
 1968: Hauptmann Florian von der Mühle
 1970: Biederleute (Television film)
 1973: Der Mann (Television film)
 1975: Sensationsprozeß Marie Lafarge (Television film)
 1978: Rentner haben niemals Zeit (Television series)
 1978: Zwerg Nase (Television film)
 1979: Pinselheinrich (Television film)
 1981: Das Streichquartett (Television film)
 1982: Geschichten übern Gartenzaun (Television series)
 1983: Zille und ick
 1986: Der Staatsanwalt hat das Wort (Television series)
 1986: Jungfer Miras Mirakel (Television film)
 1987: Drei reizende Schwestern (Television series)
 1996: Für alle Fälle Stefanie (Television series)
 1997: Praxis Bülowbogen (Television series)
 2001: Berlin is in Germany
 2003: Edel & Starck (Television series)
 2005: SOKO Leipzig (Television series)
 2005: In aller Freundschaft (Television series)
 2008: KDD – Kriminaldauerdienst (Television series)
 2009: Doktor Martin
 2009: Notruf Hafenkante (Television series)

References

External links 
 

1935 births
2016 deaths
German film actresses
German radio presenters
German voice actresses
German women radio presenters
People from Berlin